Juli District is one of seven districts of the Chucuito Province in Puno Region, Peru.

Geography 
Other mountains are listed below:

History 
Juli is mentioned as the third site where a printing press was established in the Americas, in 1612, following one in Mexico and another in Lima.

Ethnic groups 
The people in the district are mainly indigenous citizens of Aymara descent. Aymara is the language which the majority of the population (68.67%) learnt to speak in childhood, 30.56% of the residents started speaking using the Spanish language (2007 Peru Census).

Authorities

Mayors 
 2011-2014: Juan Ludgerio Aguilar Olivera.
 2007-2010: Eugenio Barbaito Constanza.

Gallery

See also 
 Administrative divisions of Peru
 List of Jesuit sites

References

External links 
 INEI Peru